Aviatico is a comune (municipality) in the Province of Bergamo in the Italian region of Lombardy, located about  northeast of Milan and about  northeast of Bergamo.

The municipality of Aviatico contains the frazioni (subdivisions, mainly villages and hamlets) Ama, Amora, and Ganda.

Aviatico borders the following municipalities: Albino, Algua, Costa di Serina, Gazzaniga, Selvino.

Demographic evolution

References

Articles which contain graphical timelines